Manuela Maleeva was the defending champion of the singles title at the 1989 Virginia Slims of Kansas tennis tournament but did not compete that year.

Amy Frazier won in the final 4–6, 6–4, 6–0 against Barbara Potter.

Seeds
A champion seed is indicated in bold text while text in italics indicates the round in which that seed was eliminated.

  Barbara Potter (final)
  Helen Kelesi (quarterfinals)
  Raffaella Reggi (second round)
  Susan Sloane (semifinals)
  Leila Meskhi (quarterfinals)
  Amy Frazier (champion)
  Dianne Balestrat (second round)
  Etsuko Inoue (first round)

Draw

References
 1989 Virginia Slims of Kansas Draw

Virginia Slims of Kansas
1989 WTA Tour